The 2017–18 season was Alashkert's sixth season in the Armenian Premier League and eleventh overall. Alashkert were defending Premier League champions, having won the title the previous season. Domestically, Alashkert finished the season as Champions for the third season in a row, six-points ahead of second placed Banants, whilst they were beaten in the final of the Armenian Cup by Gandzasar Kapan on penalties. In Europe, Alashkert reached the Second qualifying round of the Champions League for the second season in a row, where they were knocked out by BATE Borisov.

Season events
In December 2017, Alashkert entered into partnerships with Brazilian clubs Botafogo and Fluminense.

On 13 December 2017, Karen Muradyan, Zaven Badoyan, Darko Tofiloski, Norair Aslanyan and Lester Peltier all left the club after their contracts were cancelled by mutual consent.

On 8 February 2018, Alashkert announced the signing of Brazilian midfielder Odaílson to a long-term contract from Ferroviária. A day later, 9 February, Aleksandr Shcherbakov and Sergey Serchenkov both joined Alashkert on loan from Ural Yekaterinburg for the remainder of the season.

February 14th saw Brazilian Alan Pires, join Alashkert on an 18-month contract with the club after leaving A.F.C. Tubize, with former Montenegro youth team international goalkeeper Andrija Dragojević joining on 20 February from OFK Grbalj.

At the start of March 2018, Dragojević, Pires and Odaílson, all joined Ararat Yerevan on loan for the remainder of the season, whilst Miljan Jablan left the club by mutual consent.

At the beginning of April 2018, Abraham Khashmanyan resigned as manager with Varuzhan Sukiasyan being appointed as his replacement.

On 16 May, Alashkert played against Gandzasar Kapan in their first Armenian Cup final. After the game ended 0-0 in regular time, goals from Mihran Manasyan and Lubambo Musonda saw the game end 1-1 after extra time, going to penalties which Gandzasar Kapan won 4-3.

Squad

Out on loan

Transfers

In

Loans in

Loans out

Released

Competitions

Supercup

Premier League

Results summary

Results

Table

Armenian Cup

Final

UEFA Champions League

Qualifying rounds

Statistics

Appearances and goals

|-
|colspan="14"|Players who left Alashkert during the season:

|}

Goal scorers

Clean sheets

Disciplinary Record

References

FC Alashkert seasons
Alashkert
Alashkert